I Had A Ghetto Dream is a posthumous album by southern rapper Fat Pat.

Track listing
 "Da Incredible"
 "In This Life"
 "Screwed For Life" (D.E.A.)
 "Gotta Make My Dreams"
 "Is There A Better Place"
 "Peep N Me" (featuring Lil' Keke & Ronnie Spencer)
 "Do You Love The Southside" (featuring E.S.G.)
 "I Wanna Be Down"
 "M.O.B." (Southside Playaz)
 "All The Way To The Top"
 "Tops Drop"
 "Stackin' Big Paper"
 "Do U Like What U See" (featuring Double D & Big Pokey)
 "I Miss My Pat""
 "Too Hott" (Southside Playaz featuring Ronnie Spencer, C-Note, Big Moe, Lil' O, Al-D, Big Pokey, Will-Lean, Lil' Keke, Big Steve & Big Hawk)

2008 albums
Albums published posthumously
Fat Pat (rapper) albums